The French International Amateur Championship, known as the Internationaux de France – Coupe Murat, is an annual amateur golf tournament held at Golf de Chantilly in Vineuil-Saint-Firmin, France.

This championship, contested over 72 holes, was first held in 1945 under the name of the Coupe Challenge Loulou Murat. It was played in stroke play from the start, unusual at a time when most major national and international competitions were played in match play. Prince Murat, president of Chantilly Golf Club between 1909 and 1932, gave name to the trophy.

Like the French International Ladies Amateur Championship, for a few years leading up to 2002 the event was contested every two years, alternating with the Internationaux de France Match Play (Trophée James Gordon Bennet). Over time, the Coupe Murat and the Internationaux de France merged to form one and the same tournament.

The championship did not take place in 1948 and in 2020.

Winners

References

External links 
Fédération française de golf

Amateur golf tournaments
Golf tournaments in France